The Guardsman (German: Der Gardeoffizier) is a 1925 Austrian silent comedy film directed by Robert Wiene and starring Alfred Abel, María Corda and Anton Edthofer. The film was shot at the Schönbrunn Studios in Vienna. It was based on the play Testőr by Ferenc Molnár and in 1931 remade as a movie by Sidney Franklin.

Synopsis
An actor, jealous of his wife's suspected infidelity, disguises himself as an officer of the royal guard and begins courting her to try to catch her out.

Cast
 Alfred Abel as Schauspieler
 María Corda as Schauspielerin
 Anton Edthofer as Kritiker
 Karl Forest as Garderobier
 Alice Hetsey as Mama
 Biela Friedell
 Alma Hasta

References

Bibliography
 Jung, Uli & Schatzberg, Walter. Beyond Caligari: The Films of Robert Wiene. Berghahn Books, 1999.

External links

1925 films
Austrian silent feature films
Austrian comedy films
Films directed by Robert Wiene
Austrian films based on plays
Austrian black-and-white films
1925 comedy films
Silent comedy films
Films shot at Schönbrunn Studios